Jacques Van Rompaey (28 December 1899 – 30 June 1960) was a Belgian racing cyclist. He rode in the 1921 Tour de France.

References

1899 births
1960 deaths
Belgian male cyclists
Place of birth missing